Controller is the fourth studio album by the Australian rock band British India, released through Liberation Music on 22 March 2013.

Promotion and release
Controller is the Melbourne group's first album since signing to their first label, Liberation Music. This album also saw the group sign with Mushroom Publishing.

The album debuted at number 10 on the ARIA charts, the group's third album in a row to debut in the ARIA top 10.

Reception

Controller was largely well received, gaining positive reviews from a range of media sources.
One critic commented that they focused on "reclaiming the power and intensity that was lacking on their last record".

Track listing

Personnel
British India
Declan Melia  – lead vocals
Will Drummond  – bass, backing vocals
Nic Wilson  – lead guitar
Matt O'Gorman  – drums

Charts

References

External links
Official Site at www.britishindia.com.au

2013 albums
British India (band) albums